Eddie "Piolín" Sotelo, (born December 1, 1972) is a Mexican radio broadcaster. He is currently host of the nationally syndicated radio show El Show De Piolín on Entravision. His nickname means "Tweety Bird" in Mexican Spanish, a nickname he acquired as a child. Fans of his and his cast also call him “papuchón,” which means “big daddy.”

Early life 
Eddie “Piolín” Sotelo was born in Ocotlán, Jalisco, on December 1, 1972. He crossed the border to the United States when he was 16 years old.

Career 
In 2003, Piolín became host of Piolín Por La Mañana. The morning radio show was broadcast entirely in Spanish for a Spanish-speaking audience and was nationally syndicated to 50 markets. In 2006, the Los Angeles Times ranked Sotelo among the 100 most powerful people in Southern California.

Piolín was removed from Univision Radio on July 22, 2013, after the Los Angeles Times reported allegations of sexual harassment, claims that Sotelo denied.

SiriusXM launched “Piolín” Radio in 2013, and in 2014, he launched his current show El Show de Piolin on 40 radio stations.

Piolín was inducted into the Radio Hall of Fame in 2013.

References

External links

1972 births
Living people
Mexican emigrants to the United States
American radio personalities
People from Ocotlán, Jalisco
People from Salida, California